Cheondeungsan may refer to:
 Cheondeungsan (North Chungcheong)
 Cheondeungsan (North Gyeongsang)
 Cheondeungsan (North Jeolla)
 Cheondeungsan (South Jeolla)